The Family Coalition Party fielded several candidates in the 1990 provincial election, none of whom were elected.  Information about these candidates may be found on this page.

Candidates

Brantford: Peter Quail
Peter Quail is a cattle farmer and a seller of garden accessories. He has worked in Pakistan. In the 1980s, he was the North American distributor of a lightweight air-filtration helmet marketed for chronic and severe allergy sufferers. He served on the board of the Canadian Catholic Bioethics Institute in 2005. Quail received 1,413 votes (3.87%) in 1990, finishing fourth against New Democratic Party candidate Brad Ward.

He wrote a letter to the National Post newspaper in 1999, arguing that parents should not calculate the financial costs of having children when deciding to start a family. The following year, he wrote a letter calling for retention of the Lord's Prayer in the Legislative Assembly of Ontario. He has also written against the Kyoto Accord and has suggested that global warming is the result of a natural change in the earth's temperature.

Cambridge: Anneliese Steden
Anneliese Steden was raised in Germany, spending some of her early years in a small village following World War II. She described herself as a retired nurse in 2003. She identifies as a Roman Catholic and is a veteran anti-abortion activist in Canada.

Steden has been a prominent member of the group Cambridge Right to Life for many years. During the 1980s, this group was known as one of the most active anti-abortion groups in Canada. She has also been active with Operation Rescue, a group known for its aggressive protests outside abortion clinics. She was arrested in 1998 for protesting outside a Toronto clinic in violation of a court injunction; the charge was later dismissed on a technicality. She has described her upbringing a pivotal influence on her decision to engage in civil disobedience, saying that the leaders of Nazi Germany were able to commit their crimes because of a population that passively followed authority.

As of 1999, legal abortion services were not provided in Cambridge. Steden has said that this was due, in part, to the aggressive protest activities that she took part in ten years earlier. Many supporters and detractors agreed.

Steden is also an anti-pornography activist. In 1992, she wrote an opinion piece condemning her local library for carrying an erotic book by the singer Madonna.

She has been a Family Coalition Party candidate in two elections. She also ran for a seat on the Cambridge city council in 1991, running a campaign that seems to have focused on local issues. She was fifty-four years old at the time and identified as a homemaker. In 2003, she ran for a seat on the Waterloo Catholic District School Board, opposing the presence of public health nurses in Catholic high schools.

Hamilton Centre: Jewell Wolgram

Jewell Wolgram received 365 votes (1.44%), finishing sixth against New Democratic Party candidate David Christopherson.

References

1990
Conservatism-related lists